Sister Rose's Passion is a 2004 American short documentary film directed by Oren Jacoby. It celebrates Sister Rose Thering, for 67 years a Dominican nun, whose passion was combating anti-Semitism. It was nominated for an Academy Award for Best Documentary Short and won the Best Documentary Short Award at the 2004 Tribeca Film Festival.

References

External links

Sister Rose's Passion at Storyville Films

2004 films
2004 short documentary films
American short documentary films
American independent films
Films directed by Oren Jacoby
2004 in Christianity
Christianity and antisemitism
2004 independent films
2000s English-language films
2000s American films